Glen Anthony Pitre (born November 10, 1955) is an American screenwriter and film director. He has written nine films since 1986. His debut film Belizaire the Cajun was screened in the Un Certain Regard section at the 1986 Cannes Film Festival.

He was born in Cut Off in Lafourche Parish, Louisiana. In his film Belizaire the Cajun, his father, Loulan Pitre, Sr., played a role.

Filmography
 1986 Belizaire the Cajun
 1998 Haunted Waters
 1998 Good for What Ails You
 1999 Time Served 
 2002 The Scoundrel's Wife
 2003 Top Speed
 2006 Hurricane on the Bayou
 2006 American Creole: New Orleans Reunion
 2007 Journey Across India
 2008 The Man Who Came Back
 2009 Cigarettes & Nylons

References

External links

1955 births
Living people
American male screenwriters
People from Cut Off, Louisiana
Writers from New Orleans
Louisiana Democrats
Cajun people
Screenwriters from Louisiana
Film directors from Louisiana